The Sukerchakia Misl  was one of 12 Sikh Misls in Punjab during the 18th century concentrated in Gujranwala and Hafizabad district in Western Punjab (in modern-Pakistan) and ruled from (1752–1801). Misl was founded by Chaudhary Charat Singh a Jat of Sandhawalia and grandfather of Maharaja Ranjit Singh. The Sukerchakia last Misldar (commander of the Misl) was Maharaja Ranjit Singh. Towards the end of the eighteenth century, Maharaja Ranjit Singh united all the Misls and established an independent Sikh Empire.

History 
Chaudhary Naudh Singh was the Landlord Chaudhary of Gujranwala area that he renamed as Shukar Chak i.e. Thanks for the land. Chaudhary Charat Singh was the eldest son of Chaudhary Naudh Singh, the father of Maha Singh, and the grandfather of Ranjit Singh.  Charat Singh created the Sukerchakia Misl.
He distinguished himself at an early age in campaigns against Ahmad Shah Abdali and split from the Singhpuria Misl to establish The Sukerchakia Misl in Gujranwala. He married Sardarni Desan Kaur the daughter of Sardar Amir Singh of Gujranwala, an older but still powerful sardar, and moved his headquarters there. He extended his rule in Rohtas, Chakwal, Pind Dadan Khan which Stood in Pothohar Region of Northern Punjab and took Wazirabad under his control. Then came Sardar Maha Singh (d.1792) who also expanded the Misl further. After the decline of the Mughals, Maharaja Ranjit Singh united all the misls and shaped a powerful kingdom in Punjab.

"Chaudhary Charat Singh strengthened his position by matrimonial alliances.
 Dal Singh Kalianwala of Alipur renamed Akālgarh was married to the sister of Charat Singh.
 Sohel Singh Bhangi was married to the daughter of Charat Singh.
 Sahib Singh Bhangi, son of Gujar Singh, was married to another daughter, Raj Kaur.
 Charat's Singh's son Mahan Singh was married to the daughter of Jai Singh Mann of Mogalchak-Mananwala.
To establish a prominent place for himself among the Sikhs Charat Singh built a fort at Amritsar to the north of the city."  - Hari Ram Gupta

Battles fought by Sukerchakia Misl
 Battle of Lahore, (1759)
 Battle of Sialkot (1761)
 Battle of Gujranwala (1761).
 Sikh Occupation of Lahore.
 Battle of Sialkot (1763). 
 Battle of Gujrat (1797)
 Battle of Amritsar (1798)

Gallery

References

Misls
Ranjit Singh
Jat princely states
Indian surnames
Social groups of Punjab, India
History of Sikhism
Sikh Empire
Princely states of India
Princely states of Punjab
History of Punjab
History of Punjab, India
Gujranwala District